Museums of modern art listed alphabetically by country.

Argentina
Latin American Art Museum of Buenos Aires (MALBA)
Buenos Aires Museum of Modern Art (MAMBA)

Australia
Museum of Contemporary Art, Sydney 140 George Street, The Rocks, Sydney
Heide Museum of Modern Art, Bulleen, Melbourne

Austria
Museum Moderner Kunst (MUMOK) Ludwig Foundation, Museumsquartier, Vienna
Kunsthalle Wien, Museumsquartier, Vienna
Museum Moderner Kunst Kärnten (MMKK), Klagenfurt, Kärnten
Museum der Moderne Salzburg, Salzburg

Belgium
Kanal Centre Pompidou, Brussels
Centre Belge de la Bande Dessinée, Brussels
Musée communal des Beaux-Arts d'Ixelles, rue Jean Van Volsem 71, 1050 Ixelles
Musée d'art spontané, rue de la Constitution, 27 à 1030 Brussels
Musée royal d'art moderne à Bruxelles, Place Royale 1–2, à 1000 Brussels
 Museum of Modern Art, Antwerp

Brazil
Museu de Arte Moderna de São Paulo, (MAM-SP)
Museu de Arte Moderne do Rio de Janeiro, (MAM-RJ)

Canada
 Musée d'art contemporain de Montréal, Montréal
Museum of Contemporary Canadian Art (MOCCA), Toronto

Croatia
 Museum of Modern Art, Dubrovnik
 Modern Gallery, Zagreb
 Museum of Contemporary Art, Zagreb
 Ivan Meštrović Gallery, Split

Colombia
 Museo de Arte Moderno de Bogotá, Bogotá
 Museo de Arte Moderno de Medellin, Medellín

Denmark
 Louisiana Museum of Modern Art, Humlebæk
 ARoS Aarhus Kunstmuseum, Aarhus

Ecuador

Museo Antropologico y de Arte Contemporaneo (MAAC), Guayaquil

England
Annely Juda, 23 Derring Street, London.
Russian Constructivism and contemporary
Estorick Collection of Modern Italian Art, 39a Canonbury Square, London.
Modern Italian Art
Middlesbrough Institute of Modern Art, Centre Square, Middlesbrough
Modern Art Oxford, 30 Pembroke Street, Oxford
Serpentine Gallery, Kensington Gardens, London
Tate Modern, Bankside, London.
Tate Britain, Millbank, London
Tate St Ives, Porthmeor Beach, St Ives, Cornwall.
Tate Liverpool, Royal Albert Dock, Liverpool
Turner Contemporary (one of the Tate network Margate, Kent
Victoria & Albert Museum, London.

Ethiopia
 Modern Art Museum: Gebre Kristos Desta Center of Addis Ababa University

Finland
Kiasma Museum of Contemporary Art, Helsinki, Finland

France
Château de Montsoreau-Museum of Contemporary Art, Montsoreau
Espace Dalí, Paris
Faure Museum, Aix-les-Bains
Museum of Grenoble, Grenoble
Musée d'Art Moderne de Céret, Céret
Musée d'art moderne, Abattoirs de Toulouse, Toulouse
Musée d'Orsay, Paris
Musée Marmottan Monet, Paris
Musée national d'art moderne, Centre Georges-Pompidou, Paris
Musée Picasso, Paris
Musée Rodin, Paris
Musée d'Art Moderne de la Ville de Paris, Paris
Musée de l'Orangerie, Paris
Musée d'Art Moderne de Lille Métropole, Villeneuve d'Ascq
Musée Cantini, Marseille
Musée des Beaux-Arts de Lyon, Lyon
Musée des Beaux-Arts de Rouen, Rouen
Museum of Modern and Contemporary Art, Strasbourg

Germany
 Buchheim-Museum, see Museum der Phantasie below
 Deutsche Guggenheim, Unter den Linden 13–15, 10117 Berlin
 Galerie für Zeitgenössische Kunst, Leipzig
 Galerie Neue Meister, Albertinum, Brühlsche Terrasse, 01067 Dresden
 Hamburger Kunsthalle, Hamburg
 Kaiser-Wilhelm-Museum, Krefeld
 König-Albert-Museum, Chemnitz
 Kunsthalle Bielefeld, Bielefeld
 Kunsthalle Erfurt, Erfurt
 Kunsthalle Kiel, Kiel
 Kunsthalle Mannheim, Mannheim
 Kunsthalle Nürnberg, Nuremberg
 Kunsthalle Rostock, Rostock
 Kunsthalle Würth, Schwäbisch Hall
 Kunstmuseum Bonn, Bonn
 Kunstmuseum Magdeburg, Regierungsstraße 4–6, 39104 Magdeburg
 Kunstmuseum Stuttgart, Stuttgart
 Kunstmuseum Wolfsburg, Wolfsburg
 Kunstsammlung Nordrhein-Westfalen, Düsseldorf
 Lehmbruck-Museum, Duisburg
 Lenbachhaus, Munich
 Ludwig Forum für Internationale Kunst, Jülicher Straße 97–109, 52070 Aachen
 Museum Berggruen, Berlin
 Museum Bochum - Kunstsammlung, Bochum
 Museum der bildenden Künste, Leipzig
 Museum der Phantasie, Bernried
 Museum Folkwang, Essen
 Museum Frieder Burda, Baden-Baden
 Museum für Gegenwart, Hamburger Bahnhof, Berlin
 Museum für Moderne Kunst, Domstrasse 10, 60311 Frankfurt am Main
 Museum für Neue Kunst, Karlsruhe
 Museum Küppersmühle, Duisburg
 Museum Ludwig, Cologne
 Museum Ostwall, Dortmund
 Museum Wiesbaden, Wiesbaden
 Museum Würth, Künzelsau-Gaisbach
 Neue Nationalgalerie, Berlin
 Neue Staatsgalerie, Stuttgart
 Neues Museum Nürnberg, Nuremberg
 Pinakothek der Moderne, Munich
 Schirn Kunsthalle Frankfurt, Frankfurt
 Sprengel Museum, Hanover
 Staatliche Kunsthalle Karlsruhe, Karlsruhe
 Städel - Städelsches Kunstinstitut, Frankfurt am Main
 Städtische Galerie Erlangen, Erlangen
 Städtisches Museum Gelsenkirchen, Horster Straße 5–7, 45897 Gelsenkirchen
 Von-der-Heydt-Museum, Wuppertal
 Wilhelm-Hack-Museum, Ludwigshafen

Greece
State Museum of Contemporary Art, Building.01, Moni Lazariston, Lagada Street, Thessaloniki
Macedonian Museum of Contemporary Art, 154, Egnatia Street, Thessaloniki
Greek National Museum of Contemporary Art, Vas. Georgiou Β' 17-19 and Rigillis street, Athens

India
 National Gallery of Modern Art
 Kolkata Museum of Modern Art

Indonesia 

The Museum of Modern and Contemporary Art in Nusantara (Museum MACAN), Jakarta

Iran 

 Museum of Contemporary Art, Laleh Park, Tehran.

Ireland
Irish Museum of Modern Art, Dublin
Kerlin Gallery, Dublin
Luan Gallery, Athlone

Israel
Tel Aviv Museum of Art, Tel Aviv

Italy
Bologna Gallery of Modern Art, Bologna
Ca' Pesaro, Venice
Centro per l'arte contemporaneo, Luigi Pecci, Prato
Centro d'Arte Moderna e Contemporaneo, La Spezia
Museo Morandi, Bologna
Galleria Nazionale d'Arte Moderna, Rome
Galleria d'Arte Moderna, Milan
Palazzo Pitti, Florence
Peggy Guggenheim Collection, Venice
Museum of Modern and Contemporary Art of Trento and Rovereto, Trento
Museo del Novecento, Milan
Pinacoteca di Brera, Milan
Galleria Comunale d'Arte Moderna, Rome, Rome
Museo Morandi, Bologna
Galleria d'Arte Moderna Palermo
Museo d'Arte Moderna e Contemporanea Filippo de Pisis, Ferrara
Museion (Bolzano), Bolzano
Galleria d'Arte Moderna e Contemporanea, Turin
Pinacoteca Agnelli, Turin
Revoltella Museum, Trieste
Galleria d'Arte Moderna Ricci Oddi, Piacenza
Fondazione Magnani-Rocca, Parma
Galleria d'Arte Moderna, Genoa
Galleria Comunale d'Arte Moderna e Contemporanea, Viareggio
Galleria Civica d'Arte Moderna e Contemporanea di Latina, Latina
Galleria d'Arte Moderna e Contemporanea, Bergamo
Galleria Civica d'Arte Moderna Palazzo S.Margherita, Modena
Galleria d'Arte Moderna Palazzo Forti, Verona
Galleria d'Arte Moderna Gama, Albenga
Galleria Civica d'Arte Moderna, Spoleto
Galleria d'Arte Moderna Carlo Rizzarda, Feltre
Galleria Comunale d'Arte, Cagliari
Museo d'Arte Gallarate Maga, Gallarate
Museo d'Arte Moderna Vittoria Colonna, Pescara
Museo d'Arte Moderna e Contemporanea Cavazzini, Udine
Pinacoteca d'Arte Moderna e Contemporanea Repaci, Palmi
Museo d'Arte della Città di Ravenna, Ravenna
Galleria d'Arte Moderna Giannoni, Novara
Galleria d'Arte Moderna, Nervi
Museo Pertini, Savona
Museo d'Arte, Avellino

Japan
National Museum of Modern Art, Tokyo

Lebanon
Sursock Museum

Lithuania
MO Museum, Vilnius
Contemporary Art Centre (Vilnius)
National Gallery of Art, Vilnius

Mexico
Museo de Arte Moderno, Bosque de Chapultapec, Mexico City, 11560 Mexico
 Museo de Arte Contemporáneo, Monterey, Mexico
 Museo Rufino Tamayo, Mexico City, Oaxaca, Mexico

Monaco
New National Museum of Monaco

Netherlands
 Stedelijk Museum, Amsterdam
 Van Gogh Museum, Amsterdam
 Kunsthal KadE, Amersfoort
 Mondriaanhome, Amersfoort
 Museum voor Moderne Kunst Arnhem, Arnhem
 Van Abbemuseum, Eindhoven
 Groninger Museum, Groningen
 Museum Belvédère, Heerenveen
 Stedelijk Museum 's-Hertogenbosch, 's-Hertogenbosch
 Singer Laren, Laren
 Bonnefantenmuseum, Maastricht
 Kröller-Müller Museum, Otterlo
 Kunsthal, Rotterdam
 Museum Boijmans Van Beuningen, Rotterdam
 Stedelijk Museum Schiedam, Schiedam
 Kunstmuseum Den Haag, The Hague
 Museum De Pont, Tilburg
 Centraal Museum, Utrecht

Poland 
 Museum of Art, Łódź
 National Museum, Kraków

Portugal
 Serralves, Porto

Qatar
Mathaf: Arab Museum of Modern Art, Doha

Russia
Hermitage Museum, 2, Dvortsovaya Ploshchad, Dvortsovaya Square, 190000 Saint Petersburg
Pushkin Museum of Fine Arts, Moscow
Tretyakov Gallery, 10 Krymskiy Val, Moscow
Garage Museum of Contemporary Art, 9/32 Krymsky Val st., Moscow

Scotland
Scottish National Gallery of Modern Art, 75 Belford Road, Edinburgh.
Pier Art Gallery, Stromness, Orkney

Spain
Guggenheim Museum Bilbao Abandoibarra Et. 2, 48001 Bilbao
Museo Nacional Centro de Arte Reina Sofía, Madrid
Thyssen-Bornemisza Museum, Paseo del Prado, 8, Madrid.
Museu d'Art Contemporani de Barcelona, Barcelona

Sweden
Moderna Museet, Stockholm
Moderna Museet Malmö

Taiwan
 Asia Museum of Modern Art, Taichung

Turkey
Istanbul Modern, Karaköy, Istanbul
SantralIstanbul, Silahtaraga, Istanbul

United States
Museum of Modern Art (MoMA), 11 West 53 Street, New York, New York
Metropolitan Museum of Art, 1000 5th Avenue, New York, New York 
Walker Art Center, Minneapolis, Minnesota
Museum of Contemporary Art, Chicago, 220 East Chicago Avenue, Chicago, Illinois
MOCA - Museum of Contemporary Art, Los Angeles, California
San Francisco Museum of Modern Art, San Francisco
New Museum, New York City, New York
Art Institute of Chicago, 111 South Michigan Avenue, Chicago, Illinois
Bechtler Museum of Modern Art, 420 South Tryon Street, Charlotte, NC
Contemporary Arts Center, 44 East 6th Street, Cincinnati, Ohio 45202
DeCordova Sculpture Park and Museum, Lincoln, Massachusetts 01773
Guggenheim Museum, 1071 Fifth Avenue (at 89th Street) New York, New York 10128-0173
Weisman Art Museum, Minneapolis, MN
Hirshhorn Museum and Sculpture Garden, Washington D.C.
Institute of Contemporary Art, Boston, 100 Northern Avenue, Boston, Massachusetts 02210
Massachusetts Museum of Contemporary Art, North Adams, Massachusetts
Museum of Contemporary Art San Diego; San Diego, California
McNay Art Museum, 6000 N. New Braunfels Ave., San Antonio, Texas 78209
Modern Art Museum of Fort Worth, 3200 Darnell Street, Fort Worth, Texas 76107
San Antonio Museum of Art, 200 W. Jones Ave., San Antonio, Texas 78215
Grey Art Gallery, New York University, 100 Washington Square East, NYC 10003

Venezuela
Jesús Soto Museum of Modern Art, Germania Avenue, Ciudad Bolívar, Venezuela
Museo de Arte Contemporaneo de Caracas, Av. Bolívar, Municipio Libertador, Parque Central Complex, Caracas, Venezuela

Wales
MOMA Cymru/Wales, Y Tabernacl, Heol Penrallt, Machynlleth, Powys SY20 8AJ

References

 
Modern art